Ilg is a surname. Notable people with the surname include:

 Alfred Ilg (1854–1916), Swiss engineer
 Bernhard Ilg (born 1956), German politician
 Dieter Ilg (born 1961), German musician
 Frances Ilg (1902–1981), American pediatrician
 Konrad Ilg (1877–1954), Swiss trade unionist and politician
 Patriz Ilg (born 1957), German steeplechaser